Norrtulls sjukhus ("Norrtull hospital") in Vasastan, Stockholm, Sweden was erected 1883–85 as a model orphanage, converted in the 1920s to a children's hospital that in 1951 was relocated to the Caroline Institute and later renamed to Astrid Lindgren Children’s Hospital. Norrtulls sjukhus was then converted into a geriatric hospital, and in the 1990s to a psychiatric clinic. As the buildings in 2004 were deemed inappropriate, they have been sold on the open market.

The school Viktor Rydberg Gymnasium is since 2015 located to a part of Norrtulls sjukhus, which Lilla Akademien is as well.

Gallery

See also

 Stockholm City Centre
 Viktor Rydberg Gymnasium
 Lilla Akademien

References

1885 establishments in Sweden
Residential buildings completed in 1885
Hospitals in Stockholm
Children's hospitals in Sweden
Defunct hospitals in Sweden
Orphanages in Sweden